THINK Reference was a documentation database and browser developed by Symantec for programmers on the classic Mac OS platform. It was included with the THINK C development environment sold by Symantec, and contained a hypertext version of Apple Computer's Macintosh Toolbox API specifications, along with illustrative code samples.

THINK Reference was discontinued in 1994.

Integrated development environments
Macintosh-only software
Gen Digital software